Queen Inseong (18 October 1514 – 6 January 1578), of the Bannam Park clan, was a posthumous name bestowed to the wife and queen consort of Yi Ho, King Injong. She was queen consort of Joseon from 1544 until her husband's death in 1545, after which she was honoured as Queen Dowager Gongui (공의왕대비).

Biography 
Lady Park was born into the Bannam Park clan on 18 October 1514 to Park Yong and his second wife, Lady Kim of the Uiseong Kim clan. She was the only child and daughter therefore her father adopted a cousin from her immediate family.

The 10-year-old Lady Park became Crown Princess Consort in March 1524 when she married the 9-year-old Crown Prince Yi Ho (the future King Injong). That same year in the summer, her father died.

Her mother was given the royal title of "Internal Princess Consort Munso" (문소부부인, 聞韶府夫人) and her father was given the royal title of "Internal Prince Geumseong" (금성부원군, 錦城府院君) when she became Crown Princess. 

In 1544, when her husband became king after the death of her father-in-law, the now Queen Consort moved from Gyeongbok Palace's Jaseon Hall to Gyotaejeon Hall (교태전, 交泰殿). 

One year later, when her husband died on 8 August 1545, she became Queen Dowager Gongui and the king's younger half-brother became King Myeongjong since the royal couple did not have any children. But he also died on 3 August 1567 without issue, and so his half-nephew, King Seonjo, became king that same year. Her first cousin thrice removed, later Queen Uiin, was the first wife of King Seonjo. 

Queen Inseong died 11 years later on 6 January 1578 in Gyeongbok Palace's hall, Gyotaejeon, at the age of 64.

Family
Parent

 Uncle - Park Hae (박해, 朴垓)
 Uncle - Park Gi (박기, 朴基)
 Cousin - Park Gan (박간, 朴諫); became the adoptive son of Park Yong
 Aunt - Lady Park of the Bannam Park clan (반남 박씨, 潘南 朴氏)
 Uncle - Yi Gi (이기, 李技)
 Father − Park Yong (1468 – 1524) (박용, 朴墉)
 Uncle - Park Ham (박함, 朴圸)
 Uncle - Park Yeon (박연, 朴堧)
 1) Grandfather − Park Chi (1440 – 1499) (박치, 朴耒) 
 2) Great-Grandfather − Park Kang (박강, 朴薑) (? - 1460)
 3) Great-Great-Grandfather − Park Eun (박은, 朴誾) (1370 - 1422)
 4) Great-Great-Great-Grandfather − Park Sang-chung (박상충, 朴尙衷) (1332 - 1375)
 5) Great-Great-Great-Great-Grandfather − Park Su (박수)
 6) Great-Great-Great-Great-Great - Grandfather − Park Yun-mu (박윤무)
 4) Great-Great-Great-Grandmother − Lady Yi of the Hansan Yi clan (한산 이씨)
 3) Great-Great-Grandmother − Lady Ju (주씨, 周氏); daughter of Ju Eon-bang (주언방, 周彦邦)
 2) Great-Grandmother - Lady Ahn of the Sunheung Ahn clan (순흥 안씨); daughter of Ahn Song-jik (안숭직)
 1) Grandmother − Lady Seong of the Changnyeong Seong clan (창녕 성씨); daughter of Seong Hyo-won (성효원, 成孝源)
 Mother
 Biological - Internal Princess Consort Munso of the Uiseong Kim clan (문소부부인 의성 김씨, 聞韶府夫人 義城 金氏) (1490 - 1550); Park Yong's second wife
 Grandfather − Kim Ik-gyeom (김익겸, 金益謙)
 Grandmother − Lady Nam of the Uiryeong Nam clan (의령 남씨); daughter of Nam Cheok (남척, 南倜)
 Step - Lady Kim of the Gwangju Kim clan (증 정경부인 광주 김씨, 贈 政敬夫人 光州 金氏)
 Step-grandfather - Kim Geo (김거, 金琚)

Sibling(s)

 Younger half-brother − Park Chun-jeong (박춘정, 朴春丁)
 Younger half-brother − Park Pyeong (박평, 朴平)
 Younger half-sister − Lady Park of the Bannam Park clan (반남 박씨, 潘南 朴氏)
 Brother-in-law − Yi Jang (이장, 李鏘)

Consort

 Yi Ho, King Injong (10 March 1515 – 7 August 1545) (조선 인종) — No issue.
 Father-in-law - King Jungjong of Joseon (16 April 1488 – 29 November 1544) (조선 중종)
 Mother-in-law - Queen Janggyeong of the Papyeong Yun clan (10 August 1491 – 16 March 1515) (장경왕후 윤씨)

References

Notes

16th-century Korean people
1514 births
1578 deaths
Royal consorts of the Joseon dynasty
Korean queens consort